The  was an infantry division of the Imperial Japanese Army. It was formed on 2 February 1942 at Hankou as a security (class C) division, simultaneously with 59th and 60th divisions. The nucleus for the formation was the 18th Independent Mixed Brigade. Also, many of the soldiers of the 136th Infantry Brigade of the  106th Division, demobilized in 1940, were re-employed in the 58th Division. As a security division, the 58th Division's backbone consisted of independent infantry battalions, and it did not include an artillery regiment.

Action
Immediately after being formed in Hankou, the 58th Division was transferred to Yingcheng and continued at first to perform the security duties of the 18th Independent Mixed Brigade.

In May 1943, the 58th Division participated in the inconclusive Battle of West Hubei, helping to temporarily secure the Yichang - Wuhan riverway.

The 58th Division participated in Operation Ichi-Go from May 1944, operating around Hengyang between 20 July and 8 August 1944 and later around Guilin. As the Japanese forces achieved a breakthrough, the division was assigned to the Eleventh Army headquarters in Liuzhou for garrison duty. In this role it bordered the sectors covered by the 3rd Division to its south and 13th Division to its west.

The 58th Division was subordinated directly to the China Expeditionary Army and ordered to retreat 1 April 1945 following the start of the Battle of Okinawa. On 18 April 1945 the Chinese forces in Guanxi began attacking the 58th Division as it retreated to Nanjing, leading to increasing losses.

The 94th Independent Infantry Battalion, garrisoning an area 30 km north-north-east of Liuzhou was temporarily attached to the 3rd Division, arriving at Nanning 13 April 1945. The battalion was returned to 58th Division on 26 May 1945 in Binyang County. The flanking 13th Division started to retreat on 27 May 1945, and Liuzhou was finally abandoned by the 58th Division on 19 June 1945. The 106th Independent Infantry Battalion of the 58th division' became the rear guard of the Eleventh Army, and left Luzhai County on 4 July 1945. The fighting with the pursuing Chinese ceased after the surrender of Japan on 15 August 1945.

See also
 List of Japanese Infantry Divisions

Notes
This article incorporates material from Japanese Wikipedia page 第58師団 (日本軍), accessed 9 June 2016

Reference and further reading

 Madej, W. Victor. Japanese Armed Forces Order of Battle, 1937-1945 [2 vols]
Allentown, PA: 1981

Japanese World War II divisions
Infantry divisions of Japan
Military units and formations established in 1942
Military units and formations disestablished in 1945
1942 establishments in Japan
1945 disestablishments in Japan